Evan White may refer to:

 Evan White (baseball) (born 1996), American baseball player in the Seattle Mariners organization
 Evan White, former member of the heavy metal band As I Lay Dying